The Under Secretary for Rural Development (USDA(RD)) is a high-ranking official in the United States Department of Agriculture and principal advisor to the United States Secretary of Agriculture responsible for oversight of the department's rural development programs and policies.

The Under Secretary is appointed by the President of the United States with the consent of the United States Senate to serve at the pleasure of the President. The current Under Secretary is Xochitl Torres Small, who was nominated in June 2021.

Overview
The Under Secretary for Rural Development, as head of the Rural Development Mission Area, provides assistance to rural communities in the United States. In particular, this assistance comes in three areas: business, utilities, and housing. The Under Secretary for Rural Development oversees loans, grants, and technical assistance to rural residents, communities, and businesses.

With the rank of Under Secretary, the USDA(RD) is a Level III position within the Executive Schedule.

Reporting officials
Officials reporting to the Under Secretary of Agriculture for Rural Development include:
Deputy Under Secretary of Agriculture for Rural Development
Administrator of the Rural Business-Cooperative Service
Rural Business-Cooperative Service
Administrator of the Rural Housing Service 
Rural Housing Service
Administrator of the Rural Utilities Service
Rural Utilities Service

Office holders 
Under Secretary Torres-Small was confirmed by voice vote on October 7, 2021. The previous Under Secretary was Lisa Mensah, who was appointed by President Barack Obama on May 8, 2014, and confirmed by the United States Senate on November 20, 2014.

Between the two, Anne Hazlett served as Assistant to the Secretary for Rural Development, from June 12, 2017, to February 7, 2019, when Hazlett joined the White House Office of National Drug Control Policy.

References

External links
The website of USDA Rural Development
Leadership – Rural Development
The Department of Agriculture's list of positions under the Under Secretary

 
Rural society in the United States